Vincent Charles Teresa (1930 – February 21, 1990) was an American mobster in the Boston branch of the Patriarca crime family who claimed to be a top captain for Raymond Patriarca.

Early life
Teresa was born in Revere, Massachusetts in 1930. He was the grandson of Sicilian Mafia member Vincenti Teresa, who moved to the United States in 1895 and became a bootlegger during Prohibition. The younger Vincent Teresa's uncle, Dominick "Sandy Mac" Teresa, was a driver for Joseph Lombardo, the underboss of Philippo "Don Pipino" Buccola who arrived from Italy to take the reins of the New England Mafia.

While he was still in primary school, Vincent Teresa developed a gambling addiction that led him to plan and execute around one dozen burglaries. He was caught by authorities while robbing a meat market, but did not serve any jail time. Due to several incidents of violence against teachers, Teresa was expelled from school after completing the ninth grade. He subsequently joined the United States Navy, where he worked as a cook. After an altercation with a superior officer, Teresa was court martialed and given a bad conduct discharge in February 1948.

Teresa married his childhood sweetheart Blanche Bosselman in 1949. After his discharge from the Navy, he worked several odd jobs, all which he had to leave after stealing from his employers. During this time, he also partnered with a forger to pass forged checks at different New England banks and embarked on a bank robbery spree.

Career in the Mafia
Using the mob connections of his uncle, Teresa began working for Enrico Tameleo, the underboss of the Patriarca crime family. Teresa earned money by buying up businesses and burning them down for insurance money. He also opened a nightclub on Cape Cod to use as a front for his loan sharking and racketeering operations. In 1963, Teresa was detained by police in connection with a one-million-dollar heist of Ming dynasty jade. He was released due to lack of evidence. During the Irish Mob War, Teresa was once again detained by police, this time on suspicion of murdering Joseph Francione. He later stated that Joseph Barboza committed the murder.

In the mid-1960s, Teresa moved on to two new criminal enterprises. The first was the outwardly legitimate business of gambling junkets. Teresa arranged for large groups of wealthy gamblers to be flown to Las Vegas, Europe and the Caribbean where they gambled at casinos. He used the junkets to convince patrons to subsidize his illegal money lending, promising them high interest rates. He would take their money and not pay the interest, threatening them if they protested. His second venture involved a foray into selling stolen and forged bonds. In 1969, one of his associates was caught selling stolen securities and revealed Teresa's role to the FBI. Teresa was indicted and sentenced to twenty years for conspiracy and transporting stolen securities. He served several months at the Lewisburg penitentiary, housed in a cell near John Gotti, Jimmy Hoffa and Carmine Galante. After Teresa discovered that other members of the Patriarca crime family had taken a $4 million stash meant for his family, he agreed to become an informant for the FBI. He testified in front of the US Senate in 1971 and was responsible for the indictments of over 50 mobsters. He entered the United States Federal Witness Protection Program and received a new identity as Charles Cantino.

Later life
After he entered witness protection, Teresa wrote three books:  the 1973 My Life In The Mafia, co-written with Newsday writer Thomas C. Renner, which documented his Cosa Nostra career and the 1960s Boston Irish Mob Wars; the 1975 Vinnie Teresa's Mafia, also co-written with Thomas C. Renner, which documented his life during his time in the Federal Witness Protection Program and beyond; and the 1978 fictional novel Wiseguys, solely written by Teresa.

My Life In The Mafia chronicles Teresa's path to a life in organized crime, his time as a lieutenant for 
Raymond Patriarca, his fall in the Patriarca crime family, and the circumstances that led to him to seek the protection of the Federal government and the Federal Witness Protection Program. Teresa's testimony put a large number of the Patriarca crime family in jail.

Vinnie Teresa's Mafia chronicles Teresa's time as a government witness and subsequent life, with a number of anecdotes on his former life in the mob. Despite claimed government indifference, he does not succeed in making a life for himself and his family once out of witness protection. He was very bitter against the Federal government for his treatment in the Federal Witness Protection Program, feeling they used him with no regard to his safety, or an appreciation of his value. Thomas C. Renner implies this may have been more melodramatics than reality.

Teresa's final book and fictional novel, Wiseguys, was written solely by Teresa. The story is of Johnny Forza, a thinly disguised doppelganger of Teresa. It chronicles Forza's life as a betrayed government witness, his battles with a former friend mob member "Butch" (again, a thinly disguised doppelganger for New Jersey mob member Frank "Butch" Miceli), his life on the lam with his girlfriend and his final confrontations with everyone who has done him wrong.

Normally, to become a made member in an Italian mob, potential candidates have to first commit a murder at the direction of the mob. Teresa claimed that while he reached the position of lieutenant in the Patriarca crime family, this was mainly due to his prowess as a money maker for Raymond Patriarca, and that he never murdered anyone. The US government had no evidence to the contrary and as he was a very valuable witness, he was taken at his word.

In 1982, Teresa was arrested in Washington where he was living under his new identity. He was charged with conspiracy to import cocaine.

Death
Although Teresa always lived in fear of being murdered by the Patriarca crime family, he died of natural causes. In February 1990, he died of kidney failure in Seattle. His biographer Thomas C. Renner died a month earlier in January 1990.

References

 

1930 births
1990 deaths
American gangsters of Sicilian descent
Organized crime memoirists
Patriarca crime family
20th-century American memoirists
People who entered the United States Federal Witness Protection Program
Deaths from kidney failure